The Kinner Sportwing was a 1930s American light monoplane built by Kinner Airplane & Motor Corporation.

Design and development
The Sportwing was an improved version of the companies earlier Sportster designed by Max Harlow. An enlarged four-seat version was produced in 1935 as the Kinner Envoy. Kinner became bankrupt in 1937 and rights to the Sportwing were acquired by the Timm Aircraft Company.

Variants
Sportwing B-2
Powered by a  Kinner B-5 engine.
Sportster B-2R
Powered by a  Kinner R-5 engine.

Specifications (B-2)

See also

References

Citations

Bibliography

1930s United States sport aircraft
Low-wing aircraft
Aircraft first flown in 1933